Tomás Segovia (born 6 de mayo 1995) is an Argentine professional footballer who plays as a forward for Sansinena.

Career
Segovia began his career in Chacarita Juniors' ranks. He was moved into the team's senior squad midway through the 2017–18 Argentine Primera División campaign, making his professional debut on 27 April 2018 during a loss at home to Temperley. That was his sole appearance in 2017–18, though he was an unused substitute on two occasions, as Chacarita Juniors were relegated to Primera B Nacional.

Career statistics
.

References

External links

1999 births
Living people
Sportspeople from Chaco Province
Argentine footballers
Association football forwards
Argentine Primera División players
Torneo Argentino A players
Torneo Argentino B players
Chacarita Juniors footballers
Liniers de Bahía Blanca players
Club Atlético Sansinena Social y Deportivo players